Pseudotetracha greyana is a species of tiger beetle in the subfamily Cicindelinae that was described by Sloane in 1901, and is native to Australia.

References

Beetles described in 1901
Endemic fauna of Australia
Beetles of Australia